Stegothyris is a genus of moths of the family Crambidae. It contains only one species, Stegothyris fasciculalis, which is found in Madagascar and South Africa.

Holotype
The holotype of 'Stenia fasciculalis' Zeller, 1852 is illustrated on the web pages of Swedish Museum of Natural History.

References

Natural History Museum Lepidoptera genus database

Acentropinae
Crambidae genera
Taxa named by Julius Lederer